Modern literature may refer to:

 Modernist literature, the literary form of modernism
 Xiandai wenxue, a Taiwanese literature journal in publication from 1960 to 1973

See also
 Contemporary literature, literature with its setting generally after World War II
 Postmodern literature, post World War II literature characterized by techniques such as fragmentation, paradox, and the unreliable narrator
 Modern Kannada literature, in the Kannada language, spoken mainly in the Indian state of Karnataka
 Modern African literature
 Modern Arabic literature
 Modern Greek literature, in common Modern Greek, from the late Byzantine era in the 11th century AD
 Modern Tajik literature
 Modern world literature

 

pt:Literatura moderna
zh:现代主义文学